The Crying Steppe is a 2020 Kazakhstani drama film directed by Marina Kunarova. It was selected as the Kazakhstani entry for the Best International Feature Film at the 93rd Academy Awards, but it was not nominated.

Synopsis
The film is based on true events during the famines of the 1920s and 1930s in Kazakhstan.

Cast
 Akylkhan Almassov as Turar
 Sayazhan Kulymbetova as Nuria
 Dulyga Akmolda as Maden
 Adilet Zhangali as Iliyas
 Rayana Daulet as Aikynum
 Sergey Ufimtzev as Yermakov
 Safuan Shaimerdenov as Zhanibekov
 Roman Zhukov as Shilov
 Sagat Zhylgheldiyev as Omar Ata
 Aibar Tangyt as Alikhan
 Aygerim Zhunisova as Mariyam
 Balzhan Ospanbay as Bates
 Nurseyt Otkir as Magzhan
 Nurislam Sovet as Saken
 Meirlan Suleimenov as Sharniyaz
 Kulpash Malikova as Garipa
 Didar Kaden as Dosatay
 Nurzhan Abilasan as Kamil
 Denis Shevelov as Yurovsky
 Sergey Nikonenko as Goloshchyokin
 Ilya Bobkov as Tsar
 Gleb Smolkov as Alexei
 Irina Petrovna as Olga
 Elena Shmatkova as Tatiana
 Olesya Pigareva as Maria
 Ksenia Synkova as Anastasia

See also
 List of submissions to the 93rd Academy Awards for Best International Feature Film
 List of Kazakhstani submissions for the Academy Award for Best International Feature Film

References

External links
 

2020 films
2020 drama films
Kazakhstani historical drama films
Kazakh-language films
Films set in the 1910s
Films set in the 1920s
Films set in the 1930s
Films about famine
Films set in the Soviet Union
Films about the Soviet Union in the Stalin era
Films about Soviet repression
Films set in Kazakhstan
Cultural depictions of Nicholas II of Russia
Cultural depictions of Grand Duchess Anastasia Nikolaevna of Russia